Wing of sphenoid bone or ala ossis sphenoidalis can refer to:
 Greater wing of sphenoid bone (ala major ossis sphenoidalis)
 Lesser wing of sphenoid bone (ala minor ossis sphenoidalis)